Sueños (Eng.: Dreams) is a studio album released by Regional Mexican band Intocable. This album became their first number-one set on the Billboard Top Latin Albums chart for 4 weeks and received a nomination for a Grammy Award for Best Mexican/Mexican-American Album.

Track listing
The track listing from Billboard.com
Sueña  (Luis Padilla) — 4:16
Vuelve (Luis Padilla) — 3:48
Te Sigo Amando (Aarón "La Pantera" Martínez) — 3:33
Jamás Te Dije (Josué Contreras) — 3:38
Muy a Tu Manera (Ricky Muñoz/Josué Contreras) — 2:59
Alguien Como Tú (Oswaldo Villarreal) — 3:40
Desolación (Luis Padilla) — 3:43
Mas Débil Que Tú (Luis Padilla) — 4:03
El Poder de Tus Manos (Luis Padilla) — 3:03
Si Te Vas (Marco Antonio Pérez) — 4:23
¿En Qué Fallamos? (Oscar Treviño) — 3:09
Nada Es Igual (Eduardo Alanis) — 3:32
Voy a Extrañarte (Josué Contreras) — 4:07
Más Que un Sueño (José Roberto Martínez) — 2:52
Cómo Te Extraño! (Miguel Mendoza) — 3:13

Credits
The information form Allmusic.
Ricky Muñoz: Accordion, vocals, producer
René Martínez: Producer, drums, vocals
Intocable: Arranger
Miguel Trujillo: Executive producer
Gilbert Velasquez: Engineer
Chente Barrera: vocals
Sara Castillo: Text revision
José Juan Hernández: Rhythms
Sergio Serna: percussion
Félix G. Salinas: Bass
Daniel Sánchez: Vocals, bajo sexto
José Quintero: Photography
Nelson González: Graphic design, art direction
Norma Vivanco: A&R
Celeste Zendejas: Production assistant

Chart performance

Sales and certifications

References

2002 albums
Intocable albums
EMI Latin albums